The St. Clair Tunnel is the name for two separate rail tunnels which were built under the St. Clair River between Sarnia, Ontario and Port Huron, Michigan. The original, opened in 1891 and used until it was replaced by a new larger tunnel in 1995, was the first full-size subaqueous tunnel built in North America.  (By full-size it is meant that it allowed a railroad to run through it.)  It is a National Historic Landmark of the United States, and has been designated a civil engineering landmark by both US and Canadian engineering bodies.

First tunnel (1891–1995)
The first underwater rail tunnel in North America was opened by the St. Clair Tunnel Company in 1891. The company was a subsidiary of the Grand Trunk Railway (GTR), which used the new route to connect with its subsidiary Chicago and Grand Trunk Railway, predecessor to the Grand Trunk Western Railroad (GTW). Before the tunnel's construction, Grand Trunk was forced to use time-consuming rail ferries to transfer cargo.

The tunnel was an engineering marvel in its day and designed by Joseph Hobson. The development of original techniques were achieved for excavating in a compressed air environment. Freight trains used the tunnel initially with the first passenger trains using it in 1892.

The tunnel measured  from portal to portal. The actual width of the St. Clair River at this crossing is only . It was built at a cost of $2.7 million.

Locomotives

Steam locomotives were used in the early years to pull trains through the tunnel, however concerns about the potential dangers of suffocation should a train stall in the tunnel led to the installation of catenary wires for electric-powered locomotives by 1907. The first use of electric locomotives through the tunnel in regular service occurred on May 17, 1908. The locomotives were built by Baldwin-Westinghouse.

A total of six electric locomotives were supplied by 1909. Each were equipped with three 240 horse power single phase motors and weighed 65 tons.  They had a rigid wheel base and operated on a 3,300 volts, 25 cycle, single phase current.  They had a maximum draw bar pull of 40,000 pounds, and a running draw bar pull of 25,000 pounds at 10 mph.  According to a 1909 publication, it was standard practice to use two units together to pull a 1,000 ton train up the 2% grade.  The entire length of the electric line was 4 miles and the trains were able to have a running speed of 20 to 30 mph.  The Grand Trunk Railway used the locomotives to transfer both passenger and freight trains through the tunnel.

In 1923, the GTR was nationalized by Canada's federal government, which then merged the bankrupt railway into the recently formed Canadian National Railway. CN also assumed control of Grand Trunk Western as a subsidiary and the tunnel company and continued operations much as before.

The electric-powered locomotives were retired in 1958 and scrapped in 1959 after CN retired and scrapped its last steam-powered locomotives on trains passing through the tunnel. New diesel-powered locomotives did not cause the same problems with air quality in this relatively short tunnel.

Freight cars
After the Second World War, railways in North America started to see the dimensions of freight cars increase. Canadian National (identified as CN after 1960) was forced to rely upon rail ferries to carry freight cars, such as hicube boxcars, automobile carriers, certain intermodal cars and chemical tankers, which exceeded the limits of the tunnel's dimensions.

Recognition
The tunnel was designated a Civil Engineering Landmark by both the Canadian and the American Societies of Civil Engineers in 1991.

The tunnel was declared a U.S. National Historic Landmark in 1993.

The construction of the tunnel has also been recognized as National Historic Event by Parks Canada since 1992, with a plaque at the site.

Second tunnel (1995–present)

The second tunnel was built to handle intermodal rail cars with double-stacked shipping containers, which could not fit through the original tunnel or the Michigan Central Railway Tunnel in Detroit. By the early 1990s, CN had commissioned engineering studies for a replacement tunnel to be built adjacent to the existing St. Clair River tunnel. In 1992, new CN president Paul Tellier foresaw that CN would increase its traffic in the Toronto–Chicago corridor. The Canada-U.S. Free Trade Agreement was implemented in 1989 and discussions for a North American Free Trade Agreement between Canada, the United States and Mexico discussions were underway at that time (NAFTA was implemented in 1994). It was only logical that import/export traffic on CN's corridor would increase dramatically.

In 1993, CN began construction of the newer and larger tunnel. Tellier declared at the ceremonies:

"[the] tunnel will give CN the efficiencies it needs to become a strong competitive force in North American transportation"

Unlike the first tunnel, which was hand dug from both ends, an earth boring machine called the Excalibore made by the Lovat Tunnel Equipment Inc. was used. It started on the Canadian side and dug its way to the U.S.

The tunnel opened later in 1994 whereupon freight and passenger trains stopped using the adjacent original tunnel, whose bore was sealed. It could accommodate all freight cars currently in service in North America, thus the rail ferries were also retired in 1994 at the time of the tunnel's completion and opening for service.

On November 30, 2004, CN announced that the new St. Clair River tunnel would be named the Paul M. Tellier Tunnel in honour of the company's retired president, Paul Tellier, who foresaw the impact the tunnel would have on CN's eastern freight corridor. A sign now hangs over each tunnel portal with this name.

Proposed projects
Tunnel doubling in order to track doubling completion from South Bend via Port Huron and Sarnia to London. the new tunnel would be at the north of the current tunnel or the south of the current tunnel; the latter option would require the old tunnel to be filled with cement concrete.
Electrification at 25kV AC catenaries for CN Flint Line (South Bend - St. Clair Tunnel - London), NS Chicago Line and BNSF Northern Transcon.

Incident
On June 28, 2019, train CN M38331 28, hauling 100+ cars, had 40 cars derail in the tunnel, spilling 13,700 gallons of sulfuric acid and closing the tunnel for several days afterwards. The tunnel re-opened on July 10, 2019.

See also

List of National Historic Landmarks in Michigan
National Register of Historic Places listings in St. Clair County, Michigan
Port Huron station
 Blue Water Bridge, a nearby international highway bridge

References

Sources

Further reading

External links

Historic American Engineering Record (HAER) documentation:

1890-07-26: THE SIMS - EDISON ELECTRIC TORPEDO - THE TORPEDO AT FULL SPEED - SECTIONAL VIEW OF THE TORPEDO
Pictures of both tunnels
First International Tunnel Historical Marker at MichMarkers.com

Railway tunnels in Ontario
Railroad tunnels in Michigan
St. Clair River
Canada–United States border crossings
Buildings and structures in Sarnia
Buildings and structures in St. Clair County, Michigan
Port Huron, Michigan
Rail infrastructure in Sarnia
Transportation in St. Clair County, Michigan
Canadian National Railway tunnels
Grand Trunk Railway
Tunnels completed in 1891
Historic Civil Engineering Landmarks
National Historic Landmarks in Michigan
National Register of Historic Places in St. Clair County, Michigan
Railroad-related National Historic Landmarks
Railway buildings and structures on the National Register of Historic Places in Michigan
Railway tunnels on the National Register of Historic Places
1891 establishments in Michigan
1891 establishments in Ontario
Historic American Engineering Record in Michigan
Tunnels completed in 1994
1994 establishments in Ontario
1994 establishments in Michigan